Tomas Tenconi was the defending champion; however, he was eliminated by Andrea Arnabold in the second round.
Simon Greul won in the final 2–6, 6–1, 7–6(6), against Adrian Ungur.

Seeds

Draw

Final four

Top half

Bottom half

References
 Main Draw
 Qualifying Draw

Internazionali di Tennis dell'Umbria - Singles
Internazionali di Tennis Città dell'Aquila